Diba is the surname. Notable people with the surname include:
Abolhassan Diba (1894–1982), Iranian politician, businessman, and socialite 
Ad-Diba (also known as Mohamed Diab Al-Attar, 1927–2016), Egyptian footballer and referee
Anouar Diba (born 1983), Dutch footballer
Dikanda Diba (born 1966), Congolese long-distance runner
Farah Pahlavi (née Diba, born 1938), widow and third wife of Mohammad Reza Pahlavi
Johny Diba (born 1997), Congolese-born English footballer
Kamran Diba (born 1937), Iranian architect
Layla S. Diba Iranian-American curator, art historian
Vasile Dîba (born 1954), Romanian canoer
Viyé Diba (born 1954), Senegalese painter
Yitzhak Kaduri (born Diba; died 2006), Iraqi-born rabbi
Youssef Diba (born 1948) Syrian wrestler
Yves Diba Ilunga (born 1987), Congolese footballer